Himalchuli (also sometimes written as two words, Himal Chuli) is the second-highest mountain in the Mansiri Himal, part of the Nepalese Himalayas, and the 18th-highest mountain in the world (using a cutoff of 500 meters prominence, or re-ascent). It lies south of Manaslu, one of the eight-thousanders. Himalchuli has three main peaks: East (7893 m), West (7540 m) and North (7371 m).

Himalchuli is also notable for its large vertical relief over local terrain. For example, it rises 7,000 meters over the Marsyangdi River to the southwest in about  horizontal distance.

Climbing history
Exploratory visits to the peak were made in 1950 and 1954, and a first attempt in 1955 failed early on. Further reconnaissance and attempts followed in 1958 and 1959.

The first ascent was made on May 24, 1960, by Hisashi Tanabe and Masahiro Harada, of Japan. The route followed the "Sickle Ridge" from the southwest. They first climbed to the saddle between the West and Main peaks, where they placed the last of six camps. This ascent was somewhat unusual for a sub-8000m peak in using bottled oxygen.

The Himalayan Index lists five other ascents of this peak, and 10 additional unsuccessful attempts. The ascents were by various routes on the south, southwest, and southeast sides of the mountain.

The West Peak was first climbed in 1978 by two members of a Japanese expedition to the main peak of Himalchuli. They climbed from the south (the Dordi Khola) and approached the summit of the West Peak from the east.

The North Peak was first climbed in 1985 by a Korean expedition, via the North Face.

References

Sources
 
 
 DEM files for the Himalaya (Corrected versions of SRTM data)

Other references
 American Alpine Journal

Mountains of the Gandaki Province
Seven-thousanders of the Himalayas